WGN-TV (channel 9) is an independent television station in Chicago, Illinois, United States. Owned by Nexstar Media Group, it is sister to the company's sole radio property, news/talk/sports station WGN (720 AM). WGN-TV's studios are located on West Bradley Place in Chicago's North Center community; as such, it is the only major commercial television station in Chicago which bases its main studio outside the Loop. Its transmitter is located atop the Willis Tower in the Loop.

Like concept progenitor WTBS in Atlanta, WGN-TV was a pioneering superstation; on November 8, 1978, it became the second U.S. television station to be made available via satellite transmission to cable and direct-broadcast satellite subscribers nationwide. Later renamed WGN America, the former superstation feed was converted into a conventional basic cable network in December 2014, enabling it to be added to local cable providers, and later soft re-launched as NewsNation in September 2020. A charter affiliate of both The WB and of successor network The CW, WGN-TV reverted to being an independent station in 2016.

WGN-TV, WGN radio and the now-defunct regional cable news channel Chicagoland Television (CLTV) were the three flagship properties of Tribune Broadcasting, itself part of the Tribune Media conglomerate (formerly known as the Tribune Company until August 2014), until the company's purchase by Nexstar was completed in September 2019.

History

Early years (1948–1956)
The Chicago Tribune Company, headed by Chicago Tribune editor and publisher Robert R. McCormick and the owner of WGN and WGNB submitted an application to the Federal Communications Commission (FCC) on September 13, 1946, and under the "WGN Incorporated" subsidiary, to build a television station on VHF channel 9. After the FCC awarded the permit on November 8, the group originally requested to assign WGNA as the station's call sign. By January 1948, however, the company decided to call its new television property WGN-TV after WGN, which had been owned by the Tribune since 1924. The three-letter base call sign served as an initialism for "World's Greatest Newspaper", a tagline and slogan used by the Tribune since 1909.

WGN-TV began test broadcasts on February 1, 1948, then informally signed on the air on March 6 to broadcast the 1948 Golden Gloves boxing finals from the Chicago Stadium. Regular programming commenced on April 5, 1948, at 7:45 p.m. with a two-hour-long special, WGN-TV Salute to Chicago. Originating from WGN Radio's studios at the Tribune Tower's Centennial Building annex in the Magnificent Mile district, the inaugural broadcast included dedicatory speeches from McCormick, Chicago Mayor Martin Kennelly, U.S. Senator Charles W. Brooks and Governor Dwight Green. Performances were led by, among others, musician Dick "Two Ton" Baker, comedian George Gobel, and bandleader Robert Trendler and the WGN Orchestra (WGN's in-house band). Afterwards, a film previewed WGN-TV's initial program offerings. At the time it signed on, there were only 1,700 operational television sets in Chicago; that number would jump dramatically to around 100,000 sets by April 1949.

WGN-TV was the second commercial television station in both Chicago and Illinois to sign on, as WBKB (channel 4) launched on September 6, 1946, but had operated on an experimental basis since 1940 as W9XBK. Two other stations joined WBKB and WGN-TV later in 1948: ABC's WENR-TV (channel 7) on September 17 and NBC's WNBQ (channel 5) on October 8. The Tribune quickly followed up WGN-TV's launch with WPIX in New York City on June 15, 1948. Initially, WGN television and radio operated from the Chicago Daily News Building on West Madison and North Canal Streets, occupying space previously used by WMAQ radio from 1929 until relocating to the Merchandise Mart in 1935; WGN-TV also based its  transmission tower atop the building. Originally broadcasting for 6½ hours per day from 2:00 to 6:00 p.m. and from 7:30 to 10:00 p.m. seven days a week, Channel 9 started out as an independent station, then began carrying programming from DuMont on September 26, 1948, and also CBS on December 1.

On January 11, 1949, WGN-TV—along with WNBQ and WENR-TV—began transmitting network programming over a live coaxial feed originating from New York City; this allowed Channel 9 to be able to carry a regular schedule of CBS and DuMont programs that could be transmitted as they aired in the Eastern Time Zone. WBKB-TV assumed primary rights to CBS programming on September 5, 1949; as such, WGN began dropping many CBS shows from its schedule but continued to carry certain network programs that channel 4 declined to broadcast (eventually being reduced strictly to CBS's weekday morning soap opera block by 1952). During its tenure with DuMont, WGN-TV became one of that network's strongest affiliates, as well as one of its major production centers. Several DuMont programs were produced from the station's facilities during the late 1940s and the first half of the 1950s, including The Al Morgan Show, Chicago Symphony, Chicagoland Mystery Players, Music From Chicago, The Music Show, They Stand Accused (the first televised courtroom drama program), This is Music, Windy City Jamboree and Down You Go. WGN-TV had also telecast performances of the Chicago Symphony Orchestra, beginning in 1953, during Fritz Reiner's tenure as the orchestra's music director.

On January 25, 1950, the WGN stations relocated their operations to the Centennial Building. As part of United Paramount Theatres (UPT)'s merger with ABC, on February 6, 1953, CBS assumed ownership of WBKB-TV through a $6.75-million acquisition designed to allow UPT to acquire ABC-owned WENR-TV (which subsequently assumed the WBKB call letters and management staff that previously belonged to channel 4), in compliance with FCC regulations that then forbade common ownership of two television stations within the same market. As a consequence of the deal, CBS moved the remainder of its programming to the rechristened WBBM-TV on April 1; this left Channel 9 exclusively affiliated with the faltering DuMont. (WBBM would move from VHF channel 4 to VHF channel 2 on July 5, 1953, in accordance with allocation realignments dictated by the FCC-issued Sixth Report and Order.) By 1954, WGN-TV expanded its broadcast schedule to 18 hours per day (running from 6:00 a.m. to 12:00 a.m.).

After McCormick succumbed from pneumonia-related complications on April 1, 1955, ownership of WGN-TV-AM, the Chicago Tribune and the News Syndicate Company properties would transfer to the McCormick-Patterson Trust, assigned to the Robert R. McCormick Tribune Foundation in the names of the non-familial heirs of McCormick (whose two marriages never produced any children) and familial heirs of Patterson. (The trust was dissolved in January 1975, with a majority of the trust's former beneficiaries, including descendants of the McCormick and Patterson families, owning stock in the restructured Tribune Company entity—which assumed oversight of all properties previously overseen by the trust—afterward.)

Independence (1956–1995)
The station disaffiliated from DuMont when the network ceased operations on August 6, 1956, amid various issues stemming from its relations with Paramount Pictures that hamstrung DuMont from expansion. Because the three remaining commercial broadcast networks (ABC, NBC and CBS) had each owned television stations in Chicago by this time, WGN-TV became an independent station by default. Under executive vice president and general manager Ward L. Quaal (whose stewardship of the station and programming efforts earned him the National Academy of Television Arts and Sciences [NATAS]'s Governors' Award in 1966 and 1987), the station adopted a general entertainment format that would become typical of other major market independents up through the early 1990s, carrying a mix of sitcoms and drama series, feature films, cartoons and religious programs as well as locally produced news, public affairs, music and children's programs. WGN-TV also became more reliant on sports programming, led by its broadcasts of Chicago Cubs baseball games as well as other regional collegiate and professional teams. This helped Channel 9 establish itself as a programming alternative to the market's three network-owned stations and as the market's leading independent for much of the next 39 years. After initial struggles due to its carriage of programs that could not accrue viewership sufficient to attract national advertisers, WGN began turning profitable by October 1957. On January 15, 1956, the station moved its transmitter facilities to a  antenna on the roof of the Prudential Building on East Randolph Street and Michigan Avenue, and increased its effective radiated power from 120 kW to the maximum of 316 kW.

In March 1957, WGN began carrying programming from the NTA Film Network; the station served as the programming service's primary Chicago affiliate, offering the majority of NTA's program offerings. (The remaining, limited number of NTA shows not carried by WGN were split between ABC-owned WBKB-TV and NBC-owned WNBQ.) This relationship lasted until National Telefilm Associates discontinued the service in November 1961. On November 8, 1957, after conducting internal tests since the fall of 1956, WGN-TV—which had ordered RCA color television equipment in the fall of 1952—began broadcasting select programs in color, consisting primarily of syndicated programs available in the format. In January 1958, WGN became the second Chicago television station (after WNBQ, which began televising programs in the format in January 1954) to begin transmitting local programming in color; along with other color telecasting upgrades to its production and master control facilities, WGN was also the first television station in the world to use equipment (provided by Ampex) capable of videotape recording and playback of color telecasts. The first live program on the station to be broadcast in the format was Ding Dong School, a music-focused children's program hosted by Jackie Van (which WGN picked up in 1957, following its cancellation by WNBQ). In 1958, WGN-TV earned a Peabody Award—the only local television station to earn the accolade—for its short-lived children's program The Blue Fairy (which was hosted by Brigid Bazlen in the title role, and, along with Garfield Goose and Friends, was one of the first two children's programs produced by the station to be broadcast in color).

On June 27, 1961, the operations of WGN-TV and WGN radio were relocated to the WGN Mid-America Broadcast Center (later renamed the WGN Continental Broadcast Center and now simply referred to as WGN Studios), a two-story,  complex on West Bradley Place in Chicago's North Center community. The Broadcast Center, which began housing some local program production on January 16 of that year, was developed for color broadcasting—allowing the station to televise live studio shows as well as Chicago Cubs and White Sox baseball games in the format—and with civil defense concerns in mind to provide a safe location to conduct broadcasts in the event of a hostile attack (such as a bombing by a nuclear weapon) targeting downtown Chicago. It houses three main production soundstages as well as two additional soundstages that were originally used as sound recording studios for WGN Radio. The Tribune Company repurposed the former Centennial Building facility for the Chicago American (retitled Chicago Today in 1969), where the newspaper maintained office and publishing operations until it ceased publication in 1974; the space is  occupied by a Dylan's Candy Bar location. An adjacent , single-story building that housed certain non-production-related operations for the WGN stations was annexed into the facility (expanding the complex to ) in 1966.

In subsequent years, the Tribune Company gradually expanded its broadcasting unit, of which WGN-TV-AM served as its flagship stations, a tie forged in January 1966, when the subsidiary (sans the WPIX television and radio stations, which continued to be controlled by the Tribune-managed News Syndicate Co. before being fully integrated into the company's main station group following its 1991 sale of the Daily News) was renamed the WGN Continental Broadcasting Company. In 1964, the company started Mid-America Video Tape Productions, which had eventually become WGN Continental Productions (later Tribune Entertainment). The group became known as the Tribune Broadcasting Company in January 1981, but retained the WGN Continental moniker as its de facto business name until 1984 and as the licensee for WGN-TV and WGN Radio thereafter. The company gained its third television and second radio station in 1960, when it purchased KDAL-TV (now KDLH) and KDAL in Duluth, Minnesota from the estate of the late Dalton LeMasurier (Tribune sold KDAL-TV in 1978 and KDAL radio in 1981); the company would later purchase KCTO (subsequently re-called KWGN-TV) in Denver from J. Elroy McCaw in 1966. Tribune's later television purchases included those of WANX-TV (subsequently re-called WGNX, now WANF) in Atlanta (in 1983); KTLA in Los Angeles (in 1985); WPHL-TV in Philadelphia (in 1992); WLVI-TV in Boston (owned from 1994 to 2006); KHTV (now KIAH) in Houston (in 1995); KTTY (now KSWB-TV) in San Diego (in 1996); KCPQ and KTWB-TV (now KZJO) in Seattle (in 1998 and 1999, respectively); and WBDC-TV (now WDCW) in Washington, D.C. (in 1999). Six other stations—including KDAF in Dallas–Fort Worth and WDZL (now WSFL-TV) in Miami—were added through its purchase of Renaissance Broadcasting in July 1996, and two more were added through its November 1999 acquisition of the Quincy Jones- and Tribune-owned consortium Qwest Broadcasting (forcing the sale of WGNX to the Meredith Corporation in order to acquire Qwest's Atlanta property, WATL). Finally in December 2013, Tribune purchased Local TV's 19 television stations, giving WGN new sister stations in nearby markets—ABC affiliate WQAD-TV in Davenport, Iowa (serving the Quad Cities region that encompasses parts of northwestern Illinois and southeastern Iowa) and Fox affiliate WITI in Milwaukee—all three of which had pooled their local news reports as part of an existing content and broadcast management agreement formed between Local TV and Tribune in 2008.

WGN-TV was Chicago's leading independent station during the 1960s and into the 1970s, even as it gained its first four competitors on UHF, one of which would not last more than a year. Locally based Weigel Broadcasting signed on WCIU-TV (channel 26) on February 6, 1964, with a multi-ethnic programming format. On January 4, 1966, New Television Chicago—a joint venture between Field Communications (which, through parent Field Enterprises, was a sister property to the Tribunes main newspaper rivals, the Chicago Sun-Times and the Chicago Daily News, at the time) and local advertising firm Froelich & Friedland—signed on WFLD (channel 32, now a Fox owned-and-operated station), which would grow to become WGN's strongest independent competitor in the area. On May 18, 1969, Aurora-based WLXT-TV (channel 60) signed on with a mix of sporting events and a limited schedule of syndicated programs and local newscasts, operating part-time on weekday evenings and on weekends. (WLXT would cease operations on July 17, 1970.) A fourth competitor arrived on April 5, 1970, when Essaness Television Corporation signed on WSNS-TV (channel 44, now a Telemundo owned-and-operated station). WFLD and WSNS went head to head for supremacy as Chicago's second strongest independent station, and were the only independents in the market besides WGN that were able to turn a reasonable profit; in contrast, WCIU and all of the other competitors that came afterward lagged behind in terms of both ratings and revenue. (WSNS would bow out of the competition in 1982, when, after two years of carrying the over-the-air subscription service only at night on weekdays and for most of the daytime and evening hours on weekends, it converted into a full-time outlet of ONTV.) WGN-TV served as the Chicago affiliate of the United Network for its one month of existence from May to June 1967, when financial issues forced the shuttering of the fledgling network.

In May 1969, the station relocated its transmitter facilities to the -tall west antenna tower of the John Hancock Center on North Michigan Avenue. The original Prudential Building transmitter remained in use as an auxiliary facility until the transmitter dish was disassembled in 1984. WGN also served as a charter member of the Operation Prime Time syndication service, which was launched in 1976 as a consortium founded by Al Masini and a committee of executives with 18 independent stations (including WGN-TV, which was represented by then-station manager and WGN Continental Broadcasting Vice President Sheldon Cooper) represented by Masini's advertising sales firm TeleRep, offering a mix of miniseries as well as first-run syndicated programs that would be featured on the partner stations (including Solid Gold, Star Search and Lifestyles of the Rich and Famous, all of which aired on Channel 9 during the 1980s and early 1990s).

Movies became a more integral part of WGN's schedule during the late 1970s and early 1980s. During this period, depending on whether sports events or specials were scheduled, Channel 9 usually aired four daily features—one in the morning, and two to three films per night—Monday through Friday, and between three and six films per day on Saturdays and Sundays. Among its regular film showcases were WGN [Television] Presents (which aired during the late access slot weeknights from 1948 to 1995, on Saturdays until 1979 and on Sundays until 1997) and Action Theater (a showcase of action and adventure films that ran on midday Sundays from 1952 to 1956 and, later, in Saturday late access from 1979 to 2001). In February 1977, the station also began carrying a nightly prime time feature at 8:00 p.m., replacing syndicated dramas that had been airing in the timeslot. (The prime time films were pushed to 7:00 p.m. in March 1980, in accordance with the shift of its late-evening newscast into prime time). By January 1980, when WGN became the market's second television station to offer a 24-hour schedule (after WBBM-TV, which adopted such a schedule in 1976), the station began to regularly feature an overnight presentation of older black-and-white and some more recent theatrical and made-for-TV movies at 1:00 a.m. (later 3:00 a.m. by September 1983), along with a few recent first-run syndicated and older off-network syndicated programs.

Expansion into a national superstation (1978–1995)

WGN-TV began to extend its reach outside of the Chicago area beginning in the mid-1970s, when its signal began to be transmitted via microwave relay to cable television providers in areas of the central Midwestern United States that lacked access to an entertainment-based independent station. By the fall of 1978, the Channel 9 signal was transmitted to 574 cable systems—covering most of Western, Central and Southern Illinois as well as large swaths of Indiana, Wisconsin, Minnesota, Iowa, Missouri and Michigan—reaching an estimated 8.6 million subscribers. On November 9, 1978, Tulsa, Oklahoma-based satellite carrier United Video Inc. uplinked the WGN-TV signal to a Satcom-3 transponder for distribution to cable and C-band satellite subscribers throughout the United States. (United Video uplinked the station's signal without WGN Continental Broadcasting's consent, using a legal exemption in the 1976 Copyright Act's compulsory license statute allowing "passive" carriers to retransmit broadcast signals without first seeking the licensee's express permission). This resulted in WGN-TV joining the ranks of Atlanta independent station WTCG (later WTBS and now WPCH-TV) to become America's second national "superstation," independent stations distributed via satellite to cable providers within their respective regions, or throughout the country.

Within a week of attaining national status, WGN-TV added approximately 200 cable systems in various parts of the United States (reaching an estimated one million subscribers) to its total distribution. That cable reach would grow over the next several years: the first heaviest concentrations of availability outside the Midwest developed in the Central U.S. (where WGN's telecasts of Chicago Cubs baseball, Chicago Bulls basketball and The Bozo Show became highly popular) and gradually expanded to encompass most of the nation. Tribune and station management treated WGN-TV as a "passive" superstation, asserting a neutral position over United Video relaying its signal to a national audience and leaving United to handle national promotion of the WGN signal, instead of handling those responsibilities directly; this allowed the station to continue paying for syndicated programming and advertising at local rates rather than those comparable to other national networks. (Until Tribune began relaying the Chicago feed to the firm directly in 1985, the company was also not compensated directly by United Video for their retransmission or promotion of WGN's signal; Tribune, however, received royalties from cable systems for programs to which it held the copyright.) As such, WGN-TV became the first Tribune-owned independent station to be distributed to a national pay television audience (United Video would later uplink WPIX in May 1984, Netlink began distributing KWGN-TV in October 1987 and Eastern Microwave Inc. began distributing KTLA in February 1988) and the first superstation to be distributed by United Video (with WGN and WPIX being joined by Gaylord Broadcasting-owned KTVT [now a CBS owned-and-operated station] in Dallas–Fort Worth in July 1984 and, after it assumed retransmission rights from Eastern Microwave, KTLA in April 1988). For about eleven years afterward, the WGN-TV satellite signal carried the same programming shown within the Chicago market.

As it gained national exposure, Channel 9 underestimated WFLD's ability to acquire top-rated, off-network syndicated programs. WFLD's respective owners during this timeframe—Field Communications and Metromedia, the latter of which acquired WFLD in 1982 as part of Field and partner company Kaiser Broadcasting's concurring exits from the television industry—were particularly aggressive in their programming acquisitions as they leveraged their independent stations in other major and mid-sized markets for the strongest programs among those entering into syndication. Channel 32 began strengthening its syndication slate in the fall of 1979, when it acquired the local rights to off-network series such as M*A*S*H, Happy Days and All in the Family, which helped it edge ahead of WGN-TV in the ratings by the end of that year. Not to stay outdone, after Tribune appointed Robert King to replace Sheldon Cooper (who was promoted to president and CEO of the upstart Tribune Entertainment syndication unit) as the station's general manager in 1982, WGN-TV began making its own efforts to acquire stronger first-run and off-network syndicated programs, gaining the rights to series such as Laverne & Shirley, Good Times, Little House on the Prairie and WKRP in Cincinnati. WGN's ratings improved throughout the 1980s under the stewardship of King and his successor, Dennis FitzSimons (who would later elevate to President of Tribune Broadcasting, and later to Executive Vice President and then Chairman/CEO of the Tribune Company before stepping down in 2007), firmly overtaking WFLD to again become the market's top-rated independent by the end of the decade.

WGN-TV would gain two additional UHF independent competitors over the course of eight months in the early 1980s. On September 18, 1981, Focus Broadcasting signed on Joliet-based WFBN (channel 66, now WGBO-DT), initially running a mix of local public-access programs during the daytime hours and the Spectrum subscription service at night. Then on April 4, 1982, a shared operation over UHF channel 60 launched, involving Metrowest Corporation-owned English-language outlet WPWR-TV (which primarily carried the sports-centered pay service Sportsvision) and HATCO-60-owned Spanish-language outlet WBBS-TV (now UniMás owned-and-operated station WXFT-DT). (WBBS took over channel 60 full-time after WPWR moved to channel 50 in January 1987, as a byproduct of Metrowest's 1986 buyout of HATCO-60's share of the license and subsequent sale of the allocation to the Home Shopping Network.) WGN and WFLD remained the market's strongest independent stations as they both had more robust programming inventories than their competitors.

In August 1983, WGN-TV unveiled one of the most successful station image campaigns in the United States with the launch of the "Chicago's Very Own" campaign. Developed by Peter Marino (WGN-TV's director of promotions at the time) and Mike Waterkotte (then the creative director of now-defunct Chicago advertising agency Eisaman, Johns & Law), the campaign promotions focused on the city's people and cultural heritage as well as WGN-TV's local programming efforts, and were accompanied by an imaging theme performed by legendary R&B singer and Chicago native Lou Rawls. The seven-note musical signature of the image theme was also incorporated into two associated music packages that were used for the station's newscasts and identifications between 1984 and 1993, while the slogan has served as the title for two other news themes commissioned exclusively for WGN-TV in subsequent years (a John Hegner-composed package used from 1993 to 1997 and a 615 Music-composed package that has been used since November 1, 2007) as well as for a weekly profile series that aired from 1988 until 1990 and would evolve into a continuing weekly 9:00 p.m. news segment. At various points over the years, the "[city/region]'s Very Own" slogan was also adapted by some of its Tribune-owned sister stations (such as WPIX, KTLA and WTTV in Indianapolis). On November 10, 1984, WGN-TV became an affiliate of the MGM/UA Premiere Network ad hoc syndicated film service.

On November 22, 1987, during that evening's edition of The Nine O'Clock News, the WGN-TV signal was briefly overridden by video of an unidentified person wearing a Max Headroom mask and sunglasses in front of a sheet of corrugated metal imitating the moving electronic background effect used in the character's TV and movie appearances. However, oscillating audio interference obscured the audio portion throughout the 13-second video excerpt; WGN engineers were able to successfully restore the signal by changing the frequency of its Hancock Center studio transmitter link to override the pirated feed. The extended video, as seen during the roughly 90-second-long hijack occurring later that night during a Doctor Who episode on PBS member station WTTW (channel 11), featured several references to WGN-TV (including the masked person mocking fill-in sports anchor and WGN Radio sports commentator Chuck Swirsky as a "frickin' nerd" and a "frickin' liberal," and referring to his pretend defecation as a "masterpiece for all the greatest world newspaper nerds," paraphrasing the WGN callsign's meaning). Bemused, sports anchor Dan Roan—who was presenting highlights of that afternoon's home game between the Chicago Bears and the Detroit Lions (which the Bears won, 30–10) when the initial hijack took place at 9:14 p.m.—commented, "Well, if you're wondering what happened, so am I," and joked that the master control computer "took off and went wild". (The perpetrators of the WGN and WTTW intrusions have never been caught or identified.)

On May 18, 1988, the FCC reinstituted the Syndication Exclusivity Rights Rule ("SyndEx"), a rule—previously repealed by the agency in July 1980—that allows television stations to claim local exclusivity over syndicated programs and requires cable systems to either black out or secure an agreement with the claimant station or a syndication distributor to continue carrying a claimed program through an out-of-market station. To indemnify cable systems from potential blackouts, when the rules went into effect on January 1, 1990, a separate national feed of WGN that featured programs which Tribune and United Video secured for national carriage—consisting of local and some syndicated programs as well as sporting events—except those subjected to league restrictions pertaining to the number of games that could be shown on out-of-market stations annually—that aired on the WGN Chicago signal, and substitute programs not subjected to exclusivity claims—was launched. (The feed was originally structured similarly to the concurrently launched WWOR EMI Service feed of Secaucus, New Jersey-based WWOR-TV, albeit with a larger amount of shared programming. However, the amount of common programming between the WGN local and national feeds would decrease significantly during the 2000s and early 2010s as local exclusivity claims reduced the number of WGN-TV programs that Tribune could clear nationally in later years.) Of the four United Video-distributed superstations, WGN was the only one to increase its national coverage after the SyndEx rules were implemented, adding 2.2 million subscribers by July 1990; some systems also replaced WPIX and WWOR with the WGN superstation feed during the early 1990s.

Among the various community projects in which the station has been involved include the WGN-TV Children's Charities, a charitable foundation established in 1990 through the Robert R. McCormick Tribune Foundation, benefitting various local organizations that help local children dealing with poverty and medical issues. On January 1, 1993, Tribune launched Chicagoland Television (CLTV), a local cable news channel that features rolling news, weather and sports content and public affairs, sports-talk and entertainment news programs, along with having formerly acted as an overflow feed for WGN's sports telecasts. Originally utilizing its own in-house staff and resources from WGN-TV and the Chicago Tribune, CLTV consolidated its operations with WGN-TV on August 28, 2009, at which time the channel's operations were relocated from its original studio facility in Oak Brook to WGN-TV's Bradley Place studios and editorial control of CLTV was turned over to Channel 9's news department. CLTV's format soon became less reliant on live newscasts, focusing increasingly on repurposed newscasts and local programming from WGN-TV. Following its acquisition of Tribune Media, Nexstar shut down Chicagoland Television on December 31, 2019, after 27 years of operation.

WB affiliation (1995–2006)

On November 2, 1993, Time Warner and Tribune (which would acquire an 11% interest in the network in August 1995) announced the formation of The WB Television Network. Tribune committed six of the seven independent stations it owned at the time to serve as charter affiliates of The WB, though it initially exempted WGN-TV from the agreement, as station management had expressed concerns about how the network's plans to expand its prime time and daytime program offerings would affect WGN's sports broadcast rights and the impact that the potential of having to phase out its sports telecasts to fulfill network commitments would have on the superstation feed's appeal to cable and satellite providers elsewhere around the United States. Ironically, despite its concerns with taking the WB affiliation, WGN had also vied to become the Chicago affiliate of the United Paramount Network (UPN), a joint venture between Chris-Craft/United Television and Paramount Television that announced its launch plans on October 21. On November 10, 1993, Paramount announced it had reached an agreement to affiliate UPN with then-Newsweb Corporation-owned WPWR-TV, which, upon the network's January 16, 1995, launch, would become the largest UPN affiliate not to be owned by either of its parent companies.

On December 3, 1993, Tribune reached a separate agreement with Time Warner that would allow WGN-TV to serve as The WB's Chicago affiliate and allow its companion superstation feed to act as a de facto national WB feed until the network was able to fill remaining gaps in affiliate coverage in "white area" markets that lacked a standalone independent station following its launch. In exchange, The WB agreed to reduce its initial program offerings to one night per week (from two) in order to limit conflicts with WGN's sports programming. The superstation feed, which reached 37% of the country by that time, would extend the network's initial coverage to 73% of all U.S. households that had at least one television set. (Prior to that deal, The WB had considered affiliating with WGBO-TV, which Univision would later purchase and convert into an owned-and-operated station of the Spanish-language network on December 30, 1994. United Video intended to provide an alternate feed of WGN with substitute programming for markets with a WB affiliate; however, no such measure was taken, creating network duplication in markets where over-the-air WB affiliates were forced to compete with the WGN cable feed.) WGN-TV (and its superstation feed) became a charter affiliate of The WB when the network launched on January 11, 1995. Upon joining The WB, WGN's programming remained basically unchanged, continuing to feature syndicated programs, feature films, and locally produced shows. As The WB initially offered prime time programs only on Wednesdays at launch, Channel 9 filled the 7:00 to 9:00 p.m. time slot leading into its late-evening newscast with feature films or, from September 1995 until September 1997, programs from the ad-hoc Action Pack syndication block on nights when sports events were not scheduled to air. By the time The WB adopted a six-night-a-week schedule (running Sunday through Fridays) in September 1999, the station had relegated its prime time film presentations to Saturday nights.

Channel 9 chose not to clear the network's Kids' WB block, in favor of airing a local morning newscast and an afternoon sitcom block on weekdays and a mix of news, public affairs and paid programs on Saturday mornings. On February 19, WCIU-TV—which had become an English-language independent full-time as a result of Univision (from which it had aired programming on a part-time basis) moving to WGBO the month prior—reached an agreement with Time Warner to carry the Kids' WB lineup as well as to take on responsibilities of airing WB programs at times when WGN was scheduled to air sporting events during prime time. (Although the network's programming was split between WGN-TV and WCIU locally beginning with the Kids' WB block's September 9, 1995, debut, the WGN superstation feed carried The WB's prime time and children's programs until the stopgap network feed was discontinued.) Even as Chicago's network-owned stations began adopting network-centric station branding during the mid-to-late 1990s, WGN-TV continued to be referred to on-air as either "WGN Channel 9" or simply "Channel 9"; by 1999, the station began to be referred to mainly by the WGN call letters (as had been the case with the national feed since 1997). By that time, WGN replaced its late-night feature film presentations (except for the Saturday Action Theater showcase) with syndicated sitcoms.

During the latter half of the 1990s, most of The WB's remaining national coverage gaps began to be filled through standalone affiliations with UPN charter affiliates, leftover independents and former noncommercial stations as well as dual affiliations with various existing network outlets (mainly UPN stations) within the top-100 media markets, and through the September 1998 launch of The WeB (subsequently renamed The WB 100+ Station Group), a packaged feed of WB network and syndicated programs provided to participating cable-based affiliates in the 110 smallest markets. In January 1999, Time Warner and Tribune mutually agreed to stop relaying WB programming over the WGN superstation feed effective that fall; when this move took effect on October 6, the WGN national feed replaced The WB's prime time and children's program lineups, respectively, with movies and syndicated programs. By 2002, game shows and additional talk and reality series had been added to the station's schedule, while syndicated animated series were added on weekend mornings. WGN-TV—which continued to carry the network locally—began clearing the entire WB network schedule in September 2004, when it assumed the rights to the Kids' WB lineup from WCIU-TV, effectively becoming the sole remaining station in the Chicago market to run cartoons on weekday afternoons. WGN continued to carry Kids' WB's remaining Saturday morning lineup (which initially aired on a tape-delayed basis on Sunday mornings), after The WB replaced the block's two-hour weekday afternoon slot with the Daytime WB rerun block in January 2006.

CW affiliation; split of the local and national signals (2006–2016)
On January 24, 2006, the Warner Bros. Entertainment division of Time Warner and CBS Corporation announced the formation of The CW, a network that would initially feature a mix of programs originating on The WB and UPN—which Time Warner and CBS, respectively, would shut down in concurrence with The CW's launch—as well as new series developed specifically for the CW schedule. In conjunction with the launch announcement, Tribune signed a ten-year agreement involving sixteen of the group's 19 WB affiliates (including WGN-TV), which would join eleven UPN stations owned by CBS to form The CW's initial group of charter affiliates. Because The CW primarily chose its original affiliates based on the highest overall viewership in each market among the pool of existing WB and UPN affiliates, WGN-TV was chosen as its Chicago affiliate over WPWR-TV, as Channel 9 had been the higher-rated of the two stations dating to WPWR's sign-on. On February 22, Fox announced that WPWR and nine other non-Fox-O&O stations (eight UPN stations, consisting of four in other major markets where The CW chose to align with a Tribune station and four based in non-Tribune markets, and one independent station) would become the initial charter outlets of MyNetworkTV, a joint venture between Fox Television Stations and Twentieth Television meant to fill the two weeknight prime time hours that would be opened up on UPN- and WB-affiliated stations that were not chosen to become CW charter outlets. The CW did not commission the WGN national feed—which became known as Superstation WGN in November 2002 and then as WGN America in August 2008—to act as a national default feed for the network, as it was able to maintain sufficient national coverage at launch through conventional over-the-air and digital multicast affiliates in the 100 largest markets as well as supplementary coverage in the remaining 110 markets through The CW Plus, a small-market feed comprising primary and subchannel-only over-the-air affiliates as well as cable-only affiliates that were part of the predecessor WB 100+ service.

Channel 9 remained an affiliate of The WB until the network ceased operations on September 17, 2006; it became a charter affiliate of The CW when that network debuted the following day on September 18. WPWR, meanwhile, had disaffiliated from UPN on September 4 and began carrying MyNetworkTV programming upon that network's September 5 launch. As a CW affiliate, WGN-TV had been one of the network's higher-rated affiliates in terms of overall viewership, often drawing more viewers than Fox-owned WFLD—even in prime time, despite the latter's Fox programming. Channel 9 carried the entire CW schedule from the network's launch, including its children's program blocks (Kids' WB, The CW4Kids/Toonzai, Vortexx and One Magnificent Morning); however, from September 2013 to September 2016, WGN had aired the network's daytime talk show block—which had been reduced to one hour (from two) in September 2011—one hour earlier (at 2:00 p.m.) than other CW affiliates in the Central Time Zone, aligning with the block's East Coast airtime. WGN-TV gradually evolved its programming slate during the late 2000s and 2010s, adopting a news-intensive format (expanding its newscast production to 70 hours per week by 2016), and shifting its weekday daytime lineup towards mainly first-run talk and game shows during the daytime hours; as fewer film packages were offered on the syndication market, its weekend schedule also began relying less on feature films and shifted to incorporate local lifestyle and tourism programs as well as additional first-run and off-network syndicated shows.

On April 1, 2007, Chicago-based real estate investor Sam Zell announced plans to purchase the Tribune Company in an $8.2-billion leveraged buyout that gave Tribune employees stock and effective ownership of the company. The transaction and concurring privatization of the company was completed upon termination of Tribune stock at the close of trading on December 20, 2007. Prior to the sale's closure, WGN-TV was one of two commercial television stations in the Chicago market, not counting network-owned stations, to have never been involved in an ownership transaction (along with WCIU-TV, which has been owned by Weigel Broadcasting since its February 1964 sign-on). On December 8, 2008, Tribune filed for Chapter 11 bankruptcy protection, citing a debt load of around $13 billion—making it the largest media bankruptcy in American corporate history—that it accrued from the Zell buyout and related privatization costs as well as a sharp downturn in revenue from newspaper advertising. After a protracted four-year process, on December 31, 2012, Tribune formally exited from bankruptcy under the control of its senior debt holders, Oaktree Capital Management, JPMorgan Chase and Angelo, Gordon & Co. On July 10, 2013, Tribune announced plans to split off its broadcasting and newspaper interests into two separate companies. WGN-TV and WGN Radio would remain with the original entity, which was renamed Tribune Media and was restructured to focus on the company's broadcasting, digital and real estate properties; the newspaper division—which, in addition to the Chicago Tribune, included publications such as the Los Angeles Times, the South Florida Sun-Sentinel and the Baltimore Sun—was spun off into the standalone entity Tribune Publishing (known as Tronc from June 2016 until the company reverted to its former name in October 2018). The split was completed on August 4, 2014, ending the Tribunes joint ownership with WGN-TV and WGN Radio after 66 and 94 years, respectively. However, WGN-TV continues to maintain a content partnership with the Tribune.

On December 13, 2014, Tribune converted the WGN America national feed into a conventional cable channel that would focus on acquired and original programs, containing significantly more domestic and internationally acquired programming than the channel did prior to its separation from WGN-TV, and switched from a royalty to a retransmission consent revenue model. As a result, WGN America immediately ceased simulcasts of WGN-TV's Chicago-originated local programming (which was limited to its weekday noon and [until that simulcast was dropped the previous February] nightly 9:00 p.m. newscasts, select news specials, public affairs programs, special events and sports telecasts, alongside a limited number of off-network syndicated reruns, religious programs and feature films acquired for the Chicago feed). Starting with its addition to Comcast Xfinity's Chicago-area systems on December 16, the changeover allowed cable and IPTV subscribers within the market—as local satellite viewers had been able to do for about two decades—to receive WGN America for the first time. (As a result of the October 2007 separation of TBS from its Atlanta parent WTBS, WGN America had been the last remaining national superstation to be distributed to cable, IPTV, fiber optic and satellite television providers, whereas the other six remaining superstations are distributed outside their home regions mainly on satellite.) Due to the separation of the local and national feeds, WGN-TV did not carry WGN America's original drama series (such as Salem and Manhattan) outside of preview promotions, limiting the local availability of these programs to subscribers of DirecTV and Dish Network and through WGN America's streaming agreement with Hulu. WGN-TV would regain national availability in the spring of 2015, when Channel Master included the Chicago feed among the initial offerings of its LinearTV over-the-top streaming service.

Return to independence (2016–present)
On May 23, 2016, after a year of protracted negotiations pertaining to financial terms (including the share of reverse compensation that Tribune would pay to keep CW programming on those stations), Tribune Broadcasting and CW managing partner CBS Corporation reached a five-year agreement that allowed twelve of Tribune's thirteen CW-affiliated stations to remain with the network through 2021. Tribune exempted WGN-TV from the renewed agreement, intending to free up its schedule to offer an increased schedule of Chicago Cubs, White Sox, Bulls and Blackhawks games in prime time during the calendar year, thereby giving WGN over-the-air exclusivity over all sporting events it is contracted to broadcast for the first time since 1993. The WB and The CW each contractually limited the number of network program preemptions, other than those caused by long-form breaking news coverage, that could occur on an annual basis; in compliance with these restrictions, WGN-TV purchased airtime on CLTV (from 1993 to 2002), WCIU-TV (from 1999 to 2015) and WPWR-TV (from 2015 to 2016) to carry certain game telecasts that the station was contracted to produce (totaling roughly 30 per year). WB and CW network programs subjected to sports-induced displacements on their regular nights were shown on a tape-delayed basis later in the week (usually in a graveyard slot or on a weekend evening timeslot not occupied by a scheduled game telecast, as neither The WB nor The CW has ever aired prime time programs on Saturdays and as The CW had embargoed providing programs on Sundays from September 2009 until October 2018).

Concurrently, Fox announced that WPWR would take over as Chicago's CW affiliate (marking the second time that Fox Television Stations had owned a CW-affiliated station, as, under an existing contract that was already scheduled to expire before that station's conversion into a Fox O&O was announced, Charlotte sister station WJZY continued to carry the network's programming for about 3½ months after its purchase by Fox was finalized in April 2013). The final CW program to air on WGN-TV was Whose Line Is It Anyway? at 8:30 p.m. Central Time on August 31, 2016, leading into that night's edition of WGN News at Nine. Channel 9 reverted to independent status—marking the first time in 21 years that it was not affiliated with a major broadcast network—on September 1, filling timeslots previously occupied by CW network shows mainly with additional syndicated programs on weekdays and an expanded weekend morning newscast, station-produced lifestyle programs and syndicated educational programs on weekends. Beginning with that day's airing of The Bill Cunningham Show, all CW programming concurrently moved to WPWR-TV (resulting in the weeknight-only MyNetworkTV schedule being shifted to air on a three-hour delay from 10:00 p.m. to 12:00 a.m.). As such, WPWR displaced WLVI in Boston as the largest CW station that is not owned by either Tribune or CBS Corporation. (The CW would eventually move to WCIU-TV on September 1, 2019, marking the first time that channel 26—which had maintained part-time affiliations with the Spanish International Network and successor Univision, NetSpan/Telemundo, and The WB [by way of Kids' WB] at various points between 1968 and 2004—had ever served as a full-time network affiliate.)

Aborted sale to Sinclair Broadcast Group; sale to Nexstar Media Group

Sinclair Broadcast Group announced their purchase of Tribune Media on May 8, 2017, for $3.9 billion, a deal publicly met with consternation among station employees due to concerns about the influence the conservative-leaning group could potentially have on WGN's news content. In order to meet regulatory compliance, Sinclair opted to divest WGN-TV to a limited liability company controlled by Baltimore-based automotive dealer Steven Fader—who has acted as a business associate to Sinclair executive chairman David Smith—for $60 million. Under the terms of the deal, Sinclair planned to operating the station through programming and sales service agreements, and would hold an option to repurchase with eight years. Following public criticism of the proposed deal with Fader by FCC chairman Ajit Pai, Sinclair abandoned the deal and disclosed it would instead acquire WGN-TV directly. Despite this, the FCC instead voted to bring the merger up for a hearing by an administrative law judge, prompting Tribune Media to terminate the deal on August 9, 2018, and file a breach of contract lawsuit.

Following the collapse of the Sinclair merger, Nexstar Media Group agreed to acquire Tribune's assets on December 3, 2018, for $6.4 billion in cash and debt. The transaction received approval by the FCC on September 16, 2019, and finalized three days later.

Programming

Locally produced programs
WGN-TV currently produces the following programs, some of which were previously rebroadcast on CLTV:
 Adelante, Chicago (English: Onward, Chicago) is a bi-weekly public affairs program (airing Saturdays every two weeks at 6:30 a.m.) that debuted on February 19, 2000, and was originally hosted by former WGN-TV assignment reporter Eddie Arruza. Currently hosted by Lourdes Duarte (who also co-anchors the 4:00 p.m. hour of the WGN Evening News), it features topical discussions, interviews and feature segments focusing on Chicago's Hispanic community and culture.
 BackStory with Larry Potash is a half-hour historical series that premiered on October 18, 2018. Hosted by WGN Morning News anchor/assignment reporter Larry Potash and airing Saturdays at 10:30 p.m., the program looks at interesting stories pertaining to history, culture, religion and science within and outside of Chicago.
 Living Healthy Chicago is a weekly health-focused program (airing Saturdays at 10:00 a.m.) that premiered in September 2011. Hosted by Jane Monzures, it features expert medical advice and health tips from local health professionals.
 People to People is a bi-weekly public affairs program (airing most Saturdays at 6:30 a.m.) that debuted in 1973, with local civil rights leader Edwin C. "Bill" Berry as its original host. Currently hosted by Micah Materre (who also serves as weeknight co-anchor of the WGN Evening News and the 9:00 and 10:00 p.m. newscasts), the program community events and topical discussions focusing on the African-American community.
 WGN-TV Political Report, which airs Sundays at 9:00 a.m. and premiered on January 12, 2020, is a weekly political talk show in which hosts Paul Lisnek (who serves as WGN-TV's political analyst and hosted a similar daily evening program, Politics Tonight, from 2007 until CLTV's closure in December 2019) and Tahman Bradley (who serves as the station's weekend evening anchor and political reporter) provide analysis on Chicago-area and national political issues.

Channel 9 became known for its heavy schedule of local programs during the period from the 1950s through the 1980s, including some influential programs:
 The Bozo Show, a long-running children's program that aired under various titles and formats—including as Bozo (1960–1961), Bozo's Circus (1961–1980) and The Bozo Super Sunday Show (1994–2001) as well as the short-lived prime time spin-off Big Top (1965–1967)—from June 20, 1960, until July 14, 2001. The program was WGN-TV's most successful local program in terms of both ratings and cultural impact, and became the most well-known iteration of the Bozo franchise partly as a result of the exposure it received after WGN became a national superstation in 1978. Bozo originated as a live, half-hour midday broadcast (expanding to a full hour in September 1961) featuring comedy sketches, circus acts, cartoon shorts and in-studio games. The titular clown was portrayed by Bob Bell until 1984 and by Joey D'Auria thereafter, and featured additional characters such as Ringmaster Ned (Ned Locke, 1961–1976), Sandy the Tramp (Don Sandburg, 1961–1969), Oliver O. Oliver (Ray Rayner, 1961–1971), Cooky the Cook (Roy Brown, 1968–1994), Wizzo the Wizard (Marshall Brodien, 1968–1994) and the circus manager (Frazier Thomas, 1976–1985). At the peak of its popularity, ticket reservations for the show's studio audience surpassed a ten-year backlog. (WGN-TV management would discontinue the wait list in 1990, and began awarding tickets through a contest-style giveaway.) In response to Chicago Public Schools rule changes that disallowed students from going home for lunch, the program was moved to weekday mornings and switched to a pre-taped format in August 1980; to accommodate the launch of the WGN Morning News, Bozo was relegated to Sunday mornings in September 1994, remaining there until it was controversially discontinued by station management in 2001. For the final four years of its run, The Bozo Super Sunday Show was restructured to incorporate segments compliant with FCC educational programming requirements.
 Charlando ( Chatting), a Spanish-language talk show focusing on Chicago's Hispanic and Latino community (originally airing on Saturday mornings until 1992, when it was moved to Sundays) that aired from 1964 to 1999. Peter Nuno hosted the program for its entire 35-year run before retiring from WGN-TV in December 1999.
 Creature Features, a local version of the horror film franchise which aired Saturday nights from September 19, 1970, until May 19, 1976, showcasing classic horror and science fiction films released between the 1930s and the 1950s (many of which were Universal Studios releases). The films were presented by a disembodied voice known only as "The Creature" (voiced, at respective times, by WGN news anchors Carl Greyson and Marty McNeeley). After the WGN version ended, the title (unpluralized as "Creature Feature") was used by WFLD for its weekend horror movie presentations until their replacement by the Son of Svengoolie showcase in 1979.
 Family Classics, a showcase of family-oriented feature films that originally ran from September 14, 1962, to December 25, 2000 and was co-created by Frazier Thomas and Fred Silverman (then a programming executive at WGN-TV). As host, Thomas also was responsible for selecting the program's featured film titles and edited them to remove certain scenes he deemed unfit for family viewing; Roy Leonard took over hosting duties following Thomas's death in April 1985 from complications tied to a stroke, and remained in that role until Family Classics ended its initial run. (After airing weekly throughout the fall-to-spring television season—first on Friday nights until 1986, and then on Sunday afternoons thereafter—for most of its run, the program began airing sporadically during the holiday season from November 1993 until the conclusion of the program's original run.) Family Classics was revived as an occasional series on December 8, 2017, with longtime entertainment reporter Dean Richards as host.
 Garfield Goose and Friends, a children's program that aired on WGN-TV from September 1955 to October 1976 (originating on WBKB/WBBM-TV and then WBKB/WLS-TV under the unpluralized title Garfield Goose and Friend from 1952 to 1955). Considered the longest-running puppet show on television, the series was hosted by Frazier Thomas as the "prime minister" to the titular clacking goose puppet (puppeteered by Roy Brown) who designated himself as "King of the United States". The WGN-TV run of the program featured a mix of puppet characters developed by Brown before and after the show's move to Channel 9 such as Romberg Rabbit, Macintosh Mouse, Christmas "Chris" Goose (Garfield's nephew) and sleepy bloodhound Beauregard Burnside III (a character named after two Civil War generals). In addition to skits, the show also featured animated shorts (such as Clutch Cargo and Space Angel) that were introduced by the camera zooming into the "Little Theater Screen," as well as educational feature segments.
 Issues Unlimited, a Sunday morning public affairs program moderated by Chicago Bulletin editor and columnist Hurley Green Sr. from 1971 to 1987; the program featured a panel of local media representatives interviewing local and national newsmakers.
 Ray Rayner and His Friends (originally Breakfast with Bugs Bunny from 1962 to 1964), a long-running children's program hosted by Ray Rayner from 1962 to 1980. The program featured animated shorts (including Looney Tunes and Merrie Melodies cartoons), arts and crafts segments, animals (such as Chelveston the Duck, named after the military base where Rayner was stationed during World War II), science segments conducted with J. Bruce Mitchell of the Museum of Science and Industry and a viewer mail segment in which Rayner appeared alongside a talking orange dog puppet, Cuddly Dudley (voiced by Roy Brown), which was originally created by the Chicago Tribune as a promotional item.

In addition, Channel 9 broadcasts several local events including the Chicago Thanksgiving Parade (which has aired since 2007, under an agreement with the Chicago Festival Association in which the WGN national feed—which continues to carry the parade despite WGN America's December 2014 programming separation from WGN-TV—was given national simulcast rights), the Chicago St. Patrick's Day Parade (which aired from 1949 to 2002), the Chicago Auto Show (from 1952 to 1992 and again since 1999) and the Philadelphia-based Mummers Parade (by arrangement with sister station WPHL-TV). Local events that WGN-TV aired in previous years have included the Bud Billiken Parade (from 1978 to 2011, with WCIU-TV obtaining primary rights to the broadcast beginning in 2012, before shifting exclusively to WLS-TV—which had been a partial rightsholder for the parade since 1984—in 2014).

The station's Bradley Place studios, in addition to housing a large number of its own programs, have also served as the production facilities for nationally syndicated programs, including Donahue (which shifted production from the Dayton, Ohio studios of WLWD [now WDTN] to the WGN-TV facilities in Chicago in 1974, where production of the daytime talk show remained before moving to WBBM-TV's Streeterville studios in January 1982), U.S. Farm Report (which originated from the Bradley Place facility from the agriculture program's national syndication debut in 1975 until production moved to South Bend, Indiana after Farm Journals production unit assumed distribution rights from the defunct Tribune Entertainment in 2008), and At the Movies (which was produced from the facility from 1982 until 1990, three years after Gene Siskel and Roger Ebert left the program amid a 1986 contract dispute with Tribune Entertainment to develop Siskel & Ebert & the Movies with Buena Vista Television, which was produced out of WBBM-TV's studios and later WLS-TV's North State Street studios).

Channel 9 formerly served as the Muscular Dystrophy Association (MDA)'s "Love Network" station for Chicago, carrying the charity's annual telethon on Labor Day and the preceding Sunday night each September from 1973 to 2012 (in its original 21½-hour format that existed until 2010, the six-hour evening format used in 2011 and the three-hour prime-time-only format used in 2012). For most of its run on the station (except in 1994, due to the Major League Baseball strike that year), WGN-TV would preempt portions of the telethon on Labor Day to carry Chicago Cubs or White Sox games held during the afternoon of the holiday. Through its national distribution, beginning with the 1979 event, donations to the WGN-produced local segments of the telethon were also pledged by viewers in other parts of the United States and Canada. The broadcast moved from syndication to ABC in September 2013 (by then reduced to a two-hour special), airing thereafter by association on WLS-TV until the final telecast of the retitled MDA Show of Strength in August 2014.

Lottery
WGN-TV served as the originating station for the Illinois Lottery beginning at its July 1974 inception. Live drawings initially aired as a half-hour Thursday night broadcast (then hosted by Ray Rayner) held at its Bradley Place studios. Channel 9 shared the drawing rights with WSNS-TV from March to May 1975 and again from September 1975 until August 1977, when WGN gained exclusivity over the telecasts. With the introduction of the Daily Game (now Pick 3) in February 1980, drawings began airing on the station at 6:57 p.m. nightly. After a three-year run on WFLD (which assumed drawing rights in January 1984), the Lottery migrated the drawing telecasts back to WGN-TV in January 1987. In August 1992, the Lottery awarded the telecast rights to its drawings and game show to CBS-owned WBBM—which beat out competing offers from WGN and WLS-TV, and saw the move as a way to help improve viewership for its third-place-ranked 10:00 p.m. newscast—effective December 28. WBBM's bid was chosen for its offers to hold the drawings during its late newscast (which ultimately produced no beneficial ratings impact) and agreed to handle promotional responsibilities and production costs. Citing in part the station's statewide cable distribution (which, after the SyndEx rules were implemented, would occasionally subject the evening drawings to preemption associated with that of the delayed 9:00 p.m. newscast when sports clearance restrictions applied to the WGN national feed), the Lottery moved its telecasts back to WGN on January 1, 1994; with this move, citing declining revenues under the WBBM contract partly under the later drawing timeslot, the live evening results were shifted to 9:22 p.m. Midday drawings for Pick 3 and Pick 4 were added upon their introduction on December 20, 1994. (The 12:40 p.m. drawings were shown during WGN's noon newscast on weekdays, while the Saturday drawing was usually not shown live nationally because of programming substitutions.)

In addition to the live drawing results, WGN also carried two lottery-produced weekly game shows. From September 16, 1989, to December 19, 1992, and from January 8 to July 2, 1994, the station aired $100,000 Fortune Hunt. It was originally hosted by Jeff Coopwood, with co-host Linda Kollmeyer, and subsequently with Mike Jackson as host. The program saw six contestants selected from a preliminary scratch-off entry ticket drawing choose panels from a numbered 36-panel game board containing various dollar amounts. The player with the highest prize amount after five rounds won $100,000 and their two chosen at-home partners won $500 each; the remaining on-air contestants kept their existing winnings, with their partners receiving $100. (Initially, each on-air contestant was given the option of keeping their winnings or trading them for other prizes.)  Its successor, Illinois Instant Riches (retitled Illinois' Luckiest in 1998), ran from July 9, 1994, to October 21, 2000, with Mark Goodman and Kollmeyer as co-hosts. Produced in conjunction with Mark Goodson Productions (later Jonathan Goodson Productions), it featured a similar drawing format as its predecessor, but had individual contestants chosen randomly by a wheel spun by Kollmeyer each round (which was hooked to lights above each contestant's seat) play various mini-games.

In September 1996, the station began carrying The Big Game multi-state drawing (replaced by Mega Millions in May 2002) each Tuesday and Friday; Powerball drawings were eventually added upon Illinois joining that multi-state lottery in January 2010. WGN America ceased carrying the drawings nationally on December 12, 2014; the Lottery ceased televising its daily drawings outright and moved the results for the Pick 3, Pick 4, Lotto with Extra Shot and Lucky Day Lotto (formerly Little Lotto until 2011) games exclusively to its website on October 1, 2015, upon switching to a random number generator structure.

Sports programming

Throughout its history, WGN-TV has had a long association with Chicago sports, with most of the city's major professional sports franchises—particularly the Chicago Cubs, White Sox, Bulls and Blackhawks—and several local and regional collegiate teams (including the Illinois Fighting Illini, the Northwestern Wildcats, the DePaul Blue Demons and the Notre Dame Fighting Irish as well as various Big Ten Conference universities) having regularly televised their games over channel 9.

The Cubs and White Sox were the first teams to be carried on the station, when on April 23, 1948, WGN aired a crosstown rivalry game that the Sox won, 4–1. (The Tribune Company wholly owned the Cubs from 1981 until 2008, and retained a minority interest in the team until January 2019.) Over the years, the number of Cubs and White Sox games on WGN had gradually decreased (down to about 70 per season for each team by 2008) as a result of the two Major League Baseball clubs—as well as the NBA's Bulls—migrating some of their local game telecasts to cable-originated regional sports networks, Fox Sports Net Chicago (later FSN Chicago) from 1999 until 2003 and then Comcast SportsNet Chicago (now NBC Sports Chicago) beginning in 2004. Beginning in 2015, WGN-TV began sharing the over-the-air rights to Cubs games with WLS-TV, resulting in Channel 9 reducing its coverage schedule to 45 games per season as part of a four-year contract involving the two stations. WGN carried the White Sox until 1972, before returning to the station for one season in 1981; the White Sox moved its local telecasts to WGN-TV after an eight-year absence in 1990.

The Bulls began carrying their games with its inaugural season in 1966; after airing their games on WFLD for four years, the Bulls returned to WGN-TV for the 1989–90 season, overlapping with the start of the team's NBA championship dynasty during Michael Jordan's tenure with the team. WGN initially carried Blackhawks NHL games (which, per prohibitions on televised home games imposed by then-owner Bill Wirtz in order to sustain ticket sales, were restricted to away games) from 1961 until 1975. The Blackhawks returned to the station during the 2008–09 season, with a package of both home and away games (the result of Rocky Wirtz's decision to end the home game television blackout after taking over the franchise's ownership following his father's death). WGN-TV carried Chicago Bears regular season football games as a DuMont affiliate during the 1951 NFL season, after which the team moved their telecasts to ABC (and by association, ABC O&O WBKB-TV [now WLS-TV]) under a limited contract; the Bears aired their first game on WGN in 55 years on October 1, 2012, when the station carried the team's Monday Night Football matchup against the Dallas Cowboys. (NFL rules require national games aired by cable networks to be syndicated to broadcast stations in the participating teams' home markets.) Although WLS-TV has right of first refusal to MNF due to its corporate parent The Walt Disney Company's majority ownership of ESPN, WLS passed on carrying the game in order to air that night's live broadcast of ABC's Dancing with the Stars.

From November 1978 until October 2014, WGN America frequently simulcast WGN Sports broadcasts (mostly Cubs, White Sox and Bulls games) nationwide, when permitted under the station's sports contracts. (Tribune's President and CEO at the time, Peter Liguori, cited the limited viewership and advertising revenue generated from televising sports on a national basis relative to their contractual expense for its decision to stop carrying WGN's sports telecasts over WGN America after the 2014 MLB season.) In addition, until it ceased offering sporting events in September 2019, WGN-TV also distributed its White Sox and Bulls telecasts to television stations in Illinois, Indiana and Iowa that are within their respective broadcast territories (including CW affiliate WISH-TV in Indianapolis and the subchannels of WGN sister stations WHO-DT in Des Moines and WQAD in Davenport, Iowa). WGN-TV's Cubs and White Sox game broadcasts also were often carried on the MLB Extra Innings feeds available to DirecTV subscribers, sometimes including local commercials and station promotions that were not shown during the WGN America telecasts from the imposition of the SyndEx rules until the 2014 separation of the national and local feeds. (This also was the case for WGN-produced games shown on WPWR-TV, as well as WLS-TV's Cubs broadcasts.)

On January 2, 2019, the White Sox, Bulls and Blackhawks agreed to an exclusive multi-year deal with NBC Sports Chicago to take effect that fall. This was followed on February 13 by the announcement of the formation of the Marquee Sports Network, a joint venture between the Cubs and Sinclair Broadcast Group that launched in the spring of 2020. As a consequence of the four teams electing to move their local game telecasts off broadcast television completely in favor of airing them exclusively over regional sports networks, WGN wound down its local sports coverage throughout the spring and summer of 2019—beginning with the April 1 game between the Blackhawks and the Winnipeg Jets, and continuing with its final game telecasts involving the Bulls (an away game against the New York Knicks on April 9) and the Cubs (an away game against the rival St. Louis Cardinals on September 27)—as the station's contracts with all four teams gradually expired. WGN-TV's final sports telecast involving any of the station's four legacy professional sports broadcast partners was the second game of a White Sox–Detroit Tigers doubleheader at Guaranteed Rate Field on September 28, 2019. However, on February 19, 2020, Chicago Fire FC announced a multi-year agreement with WGN-TV to broadcast their Major League Soccer (MLS) telecasts on the station, beginning with its March 7 match against the New England Revolution, returning regular sporting events to Channel 9 after a seven-month hiatus. Those games moved to MLS Season Pass beginning in 2023, and without any NFL-style syndication rights, the 2022 season was the final season for Fire broadcasts on any television channel. The deal also marks the first time in the station's 74-year history that Channel 9 will not have any local sports programming on the station.

WGN returned to The CW in small manner in 2023, when it began to broadcast weekend coverage from the now Nexstar-owned network of the controversial LIV Golf league in place of WCIU, which refused to carry it due to already-existing weekend programming commitments.

News operation
, WGN-TV presently broadcasts 72½ hours of locally produced newscasts each week (with 12½ hours each weekday, 5½ hours on Saturdays and 4½ hours on Sundays); in regards to the number of hours devoted to news programming, it is the highest newscast output of any television station in the Chicago market and the state of Illinois, and the sixth-highest newscast output in the United States behind WAGA-TV in Atlanta, WHDH in Boston, KTVK in Phoenix, WISH-TV in Indianapolis, and WGN-TV's sister station KTLA in Los Angeles. In addition to its conventional local newscasts, the station produces two late-evening sports news programs: GN Sports, a half-hour sports highlight and interview program (airing nightly at 10:30 p.m.), which is co-anchored by longtime sports director Dan Roan (who joined WGN as a weekend sports anchor and sports reporter in 1984) and Jarrett Payton (son of late Chicago Bears Hall of Famer Walter Payton, and brother of former Chicago's Best host and current WFLD anchor Brittney Payton, who joined the station in 2015 as the 4:00 p.m. sports anchor for the WGN Evening News); and Instant Replay, a 20-minute Sunday evening highlight program (airing during the final 20 minutes of the 9:00 p.m. newscast), which is solo anchored by Roan.

Until regular sports telecasts on WGN-TV ended in September 2019, the station's midday, early and late evening newscasts were subject to (at least, partial) preemption or delay due to local sports telecasts overrunning into that time period; from July 8, 2010, onward, CLTV had served as an alternate broadcaster of WGN-TV newscasts that were preempted by the latter's sports broadcasts and aired live half-hour editions of WGN News at Nine on nights when Channel 9 carried a sports event being held on the West Coast that started locally at 9:00 p.m. (An additional half-hour live newscast followed the game telecast on WGN-TV, which had originally been titled under the WGN News at Nine brand prior to the 2016 launch of its 10:00 p.m. newscast.) The WGN-TV weather staff also provides local weather updates for WGN Radio under an agreement that began on October 13, 2008, at the conclusion of The Weather Channel's ten-year content partnership with the radio station.

News department history

Although sports has been a major part of WGN-TV's identity, the station has also been well known in the Chicago area for its news programming, which, through its former co-ownership with the Chicago Tribune, has played an important role since its launch. WGN's news department—which shared operations and management with WGN Radio until the news division was split into separate departments maintained by the respective properties in 1983—began operations along with the station on April 5, 1948, with the launch of its first regular news program, the Chicagoland Newsreel, which was the first television newscast in the Chicago market to consist entirely of filmed coverage. The 15-minute broadcast—which originally aired weeknights at 6:45 p.m., with a midday edition at 11:30 a.m. being added in September 1949—was anchored by news director Spencer Allen (who had been a reporter and news writer for WGN Radio since 1938) and used a large staff of photographers and technicians, many of whom had previously worked for the Tribune; Allen also anchored a 15-minute midday news program for Channel 9, Spencer Allen and the News, from 1951 to 1953.

From 1948 to 1965, WGN also produced an additional 15-minute-long newscast at 6:30 p.m., with Austin Kiplinger (to be replaced by Allen in 1953 and then by Lloyd Pettit in 1956) reading the news summary and Frann Weigel as the weather anchor; the program was expanded to a half-hour in September 1955, when Newsreel was discontinued in favor of an amended sports news segment (anchored originally by Vince Lloyd). Under Allen's leadership, WGN-TV's newscasts evolved from a "police blotter/fire alarm-type of news operation" to incorporating more in-depth and investigative reports. WGN-TV also was the first Chicago television station to televise a local appearance by a U.S. President (carrying Harry S. Truman's 1948 visit to Chicago) and provided mobile coverage of Gen. Douglas MacArthur's visit to the city (in April 1951); it has also provided coverage of the Republican and Democratic presidential conventions each election cycle since 1952, and provided extensive pool coverage of Pope John Paul II's Mass at Grant Park in 1979.

In September 1951, Channel 9 began carrying a 15-minute late night edition of Chicagoland Newsreel that followed its late evening movie presentations (which began at 10:00 p.m. at the time). By 1967, the program had evolved into Night Beat, a 30-minute overnight newscast that—until it was discontinued in 1983—featured the main anchor (which had included, among others, Greyson, McNeeley, Cliff Mercer and Jack Taylor) presenting a summary of local and world news headlines as well as a brief weather forecast summary. In February 1955, the station installed a coaxial cable link from the city room of the Chicago Tribune (originally done for the early newscast, First Edition, which aired from 1954 to 1956) to allow Tribune reporters and contributors to provide information on developing stories being covered by the newspaper and the WGN news department. After WGN-TV became an independent station in August 1956, the evening newscast was moved to 7:00 p.m.—becoming the market's first prime time newscast and often being subjected to sports-induced preemptions—before settling at 10:00 p.m. in September 1959, originally under the title 10th Hour News (known in later years as The Park-Ruddle News and [Jack Taylor/John Drury and] NewsNine). In May 1960, the late newscast (which, by that point, was anchored by Jim Conway, who also hosted a self-titled daytime talk show at the time) became the first local television news program in the U.S. to expand to a half-hour broadcast. Standard news updates presented by various on-staff anchors—under the title WGN Newsbreak—also ran during the late morning, early afternoon and prime time hours in-between programs.

In 1965, WGN appointed the first dual-anchor team ever employed in Chicago television news, as Gary Park (who came to the station from KCRA-TV in Sacramento) and Jim Ruddle (who previously worked at WTVT in Tampa) took the helm of the evening newscasts. On January 9, 1967, WGN shifted the 10:00 edition of the newscast by 15 minutes (concurrently reducing it to that length) in an attempt to improve viewership by placing the telephone quiz show The Name Game in the timeslot, reducing competition with late newscasts on WLS-TV, WMAQ-TV and WBBM-TV. (This experiment ended in May 1967, when WGN reverted to carrying the late newscast in its former 10:00 p.m. slot and expanded it to 25 minutes.) The Park-Ruddle combination was broken up in June 1967, when Ruddle left to join NBC-owned WMAQ-TV, to be followed two years later by Park taking a prime time anchor role at fellow independent KTVU (now a Fox owned-and-operated station) in San Francisco. Also in 1965, WGN premiered its first attempt at a morning news show with Top 'o' the Morning; Orion Samuelson—then a farm reporter for WGN Radio, who would eventually host the syndicated U.S. Farm Report starting in 1975—and Harold Turner (later replaced by Max Armstrong) provided agricultural news and weather. The program was replaced in May 1984 by a traditional morning newscast, Chicago's First Report, which was canceled due to low viewership that December.

The WGN news department has long been one of the most respected local television news operations in the United States and has earned several journalism awards throughout its history, including Emmy, Associated Press, United Press International and duPont-Columbia Awards. The station has also long established top-drawer talent for its newscasts, many of whom have worked at WGN-TV for more than ten years, including Jack Taylor (anchor/reporter, 1954–1984, whose run included a stint as primary weeknight anchor from 1970 to 1979), Carl Greyson (anchor, reporter and staff announcer, 1955–1980), Marty McNeeley (anchor/reporter, 1969–1986), Robert Jordan (anchor/reporter, 1973–1978 and 1980–2016), Muriel Clair (assignment reporter, 1978–present, part-time since December 2011), and Steve Sanders (anchor/reporter, 1982–2020). John Drury joined WGN-TV in 1967 for what would be a three-year stint as anchor of its 10:00 p.m. news as well as occasionally serving as anchor of Night Beat. After working for WLS-TV for nine years, Drury returned to his former role at WGN in 1979, displacing Jack Taylor as 10:00 p.m. NewsNine anchor. During his second stint at WGN, Drury took on an expanded role doing assignment and investigative reporting (often producing the reports with investigative reporter Alex Burkholder). In 1982, then-Mayor Jane Byrne, accompanied by members of her public relations and cabinet staff, tried to talk Drury into shelving a report on Byrne's use of public funds towards city festivals designed to promote her administration in relation to her stint residing in the Cabrini-Green housing project. Drury went forward with the investigative report, which aided in Byrne's loss to Harold Washington in the 1983 Democratic mayoral primary and would help earn Drury a Chicago Emmy Award for Individual Excellence (the first of four Emmys during his career).

Another mainstay of WGN-TV has been Tom Skilling, who joined WGN in August 1978 to succeed Harry Volkman (who had two stints at the station, first from 1967 until 1970 and again from 1974 until the summer of 1978) as the station's main evening meteorologist. Skilling—who is rumored to be the highest paid local television meteorologist in the United States—would become known for presenting his on-air forecasts with detailed but fairly easy-to-understand analysis and striking accuracy (most noted by his predictions of the Groundhog Day blizzard two weeks before it created paralyzing effects on the Chicago area in late January and early February 2011), and with routine usage of ensemble computer models to illustrate expected weather scenarios. Skilling has also occasionally hosted half-hour documentary specials explaining extreme weather phenomenon and advancements in forecasting technology (including 1991's It Sounded Like a Freight Train, focusing on the science of and the Chicago area's climatological history with tornadoes, and 1992's When Lightning Strikes, centering on the science and dangers of lightning), which have earned several Chicago Emmy nominations and award wins, as well as a weekly feature on the 9:00 p.m. newscast, Ask Tom Why, in which Skilling answers viewer-submitted weather questions (and which served as the basis for a similarly formatted column featured in the Tribunes weather page). Under Skilling, WGN also coordinated the centralization of its weather operations to encompass WGN-TV, WGN Radio, CLTV and the Tribune, and, in May 2007, became a broadcast partner in the WeatherBug real-time automated weather observation network (the largest station member by market size). Skilling holds the record as the longest-serving television meteorologist at a single station in the Chicago market, having served as chief meteorologist at WGN-TV for 42 years . (Volkman holds the record as Chicago's longest-serving television meteorologist overall, having worked in the market from 1959 until his retirement from broadcasting in 2004, including other stints at WMAQ-TV and WFLD as well as an 18-year run as chief meteorologist at WBBM-TV.)

The late newscast was moved into prime time on March 10, 1980, concurrently becoming known as The Nine O'Clock News (later retitled WGN News at Nine in May 1993, as part of a uniform retitling of its newscasts under the "WGN News" moniker used in some promotions and report sign-offs since 1981). The shift to the 9:00 p.m. hour briefly made it the first hour-long prime time newscast in the Midwest and, for its first seven years in that slot, it was the Chicago market's only local television newscast at 9:00. Initially airing five nights a week for one hour, the revamped weeknight-only newscast was first anchored by the prior NewsNine team of Drury, Skilling, sports anchor Bill Frink and commentator Len O'Connor. On June 9 of that year, the program switched to a hybrid local-national format that incorporated the Independent Network News (INN)—a Tribune-syndicated nightly news program originating from New York sister station WPIX, which was later retitled INN: The Independent News in September 1984 and USA Tonight in January 1987—in place of the locally produced segments that had occupied the 9:30 p.m. half-hour since the March format change. After briefly being relegated to weeknights following the shift to prime time, half-hour weekend editions of the 9:00 p.m. broadcast were added on October 4, 1980, anchored originally by Larry Roderick and Robert Jordan. By 1985, Drury (who returned to his previous role as main co-anchor at WLS-TV in late 1984) and Denise Cannon (who became the former's co-anchor in 1981 and departed at the end of 1984) were succeeded as principal anchors by Rick Rosenthal and Pat Harvey.

Since the reformatting as a prime time newscast, WGN-TV has been the ratings leader in the 9:00 p.m. timeslot, with or without news competition in the arena and even at times when weaker-rated shows led into the newscast, and typically holds a larger audience than the 10:00 p.m. newscast on WBBM-TV. The 9:00 p.m. newscast's dominance was to such an extent that, from 1984 until 1989 (when it was unseated by KTVU in San Francisco), it had the largest viewership of any prime time local newscast in the United States. Legitimate competition sprang up for The Nine O'Clock News on November 16, 1987, when Fox O&O WFLD consolidated the half-hour 7:00 and 11:00 p.m. newscasts that launched its full-scale news operation three months earlier into a single broadcast at 9:00. Although WFLD aggressively marketed its fledgling newscast towards younger audiences as having a fresher style compared to WGN's more traditional news format, viewer loyalty has continued to propel Channel 9 to No. 1 in the ratings at 9:00 to the present day (with one of the only exceptions being a tie with Channel 32 in the May 1996 sweeps period), even with the WFLD newscast having the Fox prime time lineup as its lead-in. For this reason, WFLD moved its newscast back to its original 7:00 p.m. timeslot in September 1988, only to return it to 9:00 the following year to accommodate the planned expansion of Fox's prime time lineup. A sports highlight and interview program, Instant Replay, which has been hosted since its debut by sports director Dan Roan, began accompanying the Sunday edition of the newscast in August 1987. WGN re-expanded its prime time newscast to one hour on June 4, 1990, after Tribune discontinued production of USA Tonight under a collaborative agreement between Tribune and Turner Broadcasting in which the Tribune stations were granted access to CNN Newsource content and began feeding video footage to the CNN video wire service.

WGN began programming long-form news outside its established 9:00 p.m. slot on September 19, 1983, when it debuted Midday Newscope, which grew out of the three-minute-long local news segments that had aired during the INN Midday Edition (which followed the newscast until that program's September 1985 cancellation) since January 1983. Originally anchored by Rick Rosenthal (who was replaced by Steve Sanders, after Rosenthal replaced Drury as 9:00 p.m. co-anchor in 1984), the newscast—a local version of Telepictures and Gannett Broadcasting's short-lived syndicated format, Newscope—featured a hybrid of local news headlines and weather forecasts and in-depth consumer, financial, entertainment and lifestyle features. The program was reformatted into a more traditional newscast, retitled Chicago's Midday News, on September 17, 1984, and later expanded to an hour in September 1985. The midday newscast—which concurrently rebranded from WGN News at Noon to the WGN Midday News with the expansion—would eventually expand to 90 minutes (moving to an 11:30 a.m. start) on September 15, 2008; it was subsequently expanded to two hours (moving to 11:00 a.m.) on October 5, 2009. On September 19, 1988, WGN became the first Chicago television station to closed caption its newscasts for the hearing impaired.

On January 25, 1992, the station debuted hour-long 8:00 a.m. newscasts on Saturdays and Sundays. To accommodate the launch of Chicago's Weekend Morning News (which marked the first major weekend morning news attempt in Chicago television and one of the only instances of a television station carrying a morning newscast on weekends without already having a weekday equivalent) and the concurring moves of Charlando and People to People to Sundays, WGN dropped three long-running religious programs—What's Nu (produced by the Chicago Board of Rabbis), Heritage of Faith (produced by Protestant group Greater Chicago Broadcast Ministries) and Mass for Shut-ins (produced by the Roman Catholic Archdiocese of Chicago)—from its Sunday morning lineup, a move that was criticized by the Council of Religious Leaders of Metropolitan Chicago and other religious groups on grounds that the programs catered to diverse religious audiences in fulfillment of the station's public service programming obligations. (The latter two programs were subsequently acquired by WGBO-TV, under an agreement which allowed them to continue to be produced out of the WGN-TV studios.) The Sunday edition was discontinued after the September 4, 1994, broadcast; the Saturday edition would follow suit four years later on December 19, 1998, with then-news director Steve Ramsey citing the need to provide more resources for its weekday morning newscasts. Weekend morning newscasts returned on October 2, 2010, with the debut of hour-long editions at 6:00 a.m. (shifted to a two-hour block at 7:00 a.m. on September 10, 2016, following Channel 9's disaffiliation from The CW, and expanded to a third hour on Saturdays until 10:00 a.m. on January 11, 2020.).

Morning news programming was extended to weekdays on September 6, 1994, with the WGN Morning News debuting as a one-hour broadcast from 7:00 to 8:00 a.m., anchored originally by Dave Eckert, Sonja Gantt and meteorologist Paul Huttner. In an effort to improve viewership, the program—which replaced children's programs (including The Bozo Show, which displaced the Sunday edition of the morning newscast) that had previously aired in that time period—was soon reformatted from a more traditional newscast to feature a mix of straight news and entertainment and lifestyle features that use a looser style similar to morning radio programs. This reformatting helped the Morning News to eventually begin beating competing local and national morning news programs—including its closest initial competitor, WFLD's Fox Thing in the Morning (now Good Day Chicago)—in the 25–54 age demographic and in total viewers. (The program would expand to two hours, extending until 9:00 a.m., on January 8, 1996, with a later hour-long expansion [to 10:00 a.m.] on September 3, 2013.) An hour-long 6:00 a.m. "Early Edition" of the newscast debuted on August 5, 1996; this block of the newscast would gradually expand to three hours, beginning with the addition of a 5:30 a.m. half-hour in January 2001 and ending with its July 11, 2011, extension to 4:00 a.m. (The WGN Morning News became the first WGN-TV newscast to be denied clearance on the national feed in September 1996, with its forced removal reportedly being due to self-imposed exclusivity restrictions concerning the newscast's paid segments and rate charges that the station's sales department would have to pay if the segments aired nationally; simulcasts of the WGN Morning News temporarily returned to WGN America on February 3, 2014, when it began airing the 4:00 a.m. hour.)

In July 1996, WGN-TV began using a Eurocopter AS350 B2 helicopter for newsgathering, "Skycam 9," which is used for certain breaking news events and traffic reporting. In October 1999, freelance reporter Jane Boal made headlines when she was hit from behind while trying to move away from a car attempting to drive away from an accident with another vehicle during a live midday report about a carbon monoxide leak that forced the evacuation of a school in the Rogers Park neighborhood; Boal (who was laid off by the station in May 2009) suffered cartilage and ligament injuries to both of her legs after being pinned between the car involved in the accident and a WGN live truck, but was able to resume work in early November.

WGN scored a major coup in April 2008, when it persuaded veteran WMAQ-TV and WFLD anchor Mark Suppelsa—who turned down a contract with the latter station due to a proposed salary cut—to take over as lead anchor of the 9:00 p.m. newscast, replacing Steve Sanders (who was moved to the midday newscast and was later joined in September 2009 by his former co-anchor on the 9:00 p.m. broadcast from 1993 until Suppelsa's appointment, Allison Payne, after Micah Materre moved to the prime time newscasts full-time). Suppelsa remained a main co-anchor of the weeknight newscasts until his retirement from broadcasting in December 2017, and was replaced two months later by Joe Donlon (who served a similar role at KGW in Portland, Oregon, and would himself depart WGN-TV in June 2020 to become main co-anchor of sister network WGN Americas fledgling prime time newscast NewsNation). On July 19, 2008, beginning with that night's edition of the 9:00 p.m. newscast, WGN-TV became the third television station in the Chicago market to begin broadcasting its local newscasts in high definition. Video from remote and field equipment was initially broadcast in 480p standard definition following the transition; high definition cameras began to be used for field reports in July 2010, a move which made WGN-TV the first station in the market to broadcast all locally originated portions of its newscasts (including live field reports) in HD.

Starting under the direction of now-former news director Greg Caputo, WGN-TV spearheaded a major expansion of its news programming. In addition to the expansions of its existing newscasts, WGN first launched an early-evening newscast on September 15, 2008, when the WGN Evening News premiered as a half-hour weeknight broadcast at 5:30 p.m. The newscast expanded to one hour (starting at 5:00 p.m.) on October 5, 2009, with Saturday and Sunday editions being added on July 12, 2014. The weekday editions of the newscast were later expanded to include a second hour (starting at 4:00 p.m.) on September 8, 2014, and then to three hours (extending it to the 6:00 p.m. hour) on April 4, 2017. (The superstation feed did not clear any of the expanded newscasts up until the conversion of WGN America into a conventional cable channel.) In 2009, WGN-TV began streaming its weekday midday and 5:00 p.m. newscasts live on its website. On February 22, 2010, WGN-TV became the first television station in the Chicago market to allow iPhone users to watch live streams of its newscasts; the 6:00 to 9:00 a.m. block of the WGN Morning News, the midday and 5:00 p.m. newscasts were initially available for streaming to iPhone users. (At present, all newscasts are streamed through the station's website and on Apple devices, though sports segments are blacked out—presented only with the audio feed—due to streaming restrictions on sports highlights imposed by the major sports leagues.)

On October 5, 2015, the station restored a 10:00 p.m. newscast—originally only airing Monday through Friday nights—to its schedule after a 35-year absence; weekend editions of the 10:00 broadcast were added on January 11, 2020. A secondary live sports news show, GN Sports, premiered on January 28, 2020, as the lead-out program for the weeknight 10:00 p.m. newscasts; co-hosted by Dan Roan and Jarrett Payton, the program focuses on sports news and highlights, feature segments and in-studio interviews in a similar format as Instant Replay, as well as including sports gaming and fantasy sports analysis. (Payton formerly co-hosted the similar CLTV program Sports Feed—alongside WGN sports reporter Josh Frydman, who serves as a GN Sports contributor—from 2015 until Nexstar shut down the cable news channel in December 2019.) Weekend editions of GN Sports were added on August 14, 2021, with the Sunday broadcast replacing the cuisine and tourism program Chicago's Best (which had aired on WGN for ten years from January 2011 until August 8, 2021).

Notable on-air staff 
Current staff
 Jackie Bange – weekend evening anchor
 Lourdes Duarte – weekday afternoon anchor
 Tim Joyce – weekend morning meteorologist
 Paul M. Lisnek – political analyst
 Dan Ponce – weekday morning anchor
 Dean Richards – entertainment reporter and film critic
 Tom Skilling – chief meteorologist

Former staff

 Fran Allison
 Mike Barz 
 Brigid Bazlen
 Bob Bell
 Steve Bell
 Lou Boudreau
 Thom Brennaman
 Jack Brickhouse
 Marshall Brodien
 Lorn Brown
 Roy Brown
 Cheryl Burton 
 Chip Caray 
 Harry Caray
 Susan Carlson
 Bob Collins
 Bob Costas 
 Joey D'Auria
 Merri Dee
 Phil Donahue
 Mike Douglas
 John Drury
 Jim Durham
 Judie Garcia
 Milo Hamilton
 Pat Harvey 
 Frances Horwich
 Bill Jackson
 Bob Jordan (retired)
 Johnny "Red" Kerr
 Rich King
 Wayne Larrivee 
 Roy Leonard
 Vince Lloyd
 Ned Locke
 Nancy Loo 
 Jim Lounsbury
 Joe McConnell
 Elaine Mulqueen
 Allison Payne
 Lloyd Pettit
 Jimmy Piersall
 Ray Rayner
 Ron Rivera 
 Randy Salerno
 Don Sandburg
 John Schubeck
 Keenan Smith 
 Wendell Smith
 Mark Suppelsa (retired)
 Chuck Swirsky
 Jack Taylor
 Roseanne Tellez 
 Frazier Thomas
 Bob Trendler
 Robert Urich
 Harry Volkman
 Jenniffer Weigel
 Jim Williams 
 Bill Weir

Technical information

Subchannels
The station's digital signal is multiplexed:

Analog-to-digital transition
WGN-TV began transmitting a digital television signal on UHF channel 19 on January 4, 2001, operating from a transmitter located  atop the Sears Tower. (Incidentally, WGN-TV was one of six, originally eight, Chicago television stations that declined offers to move their analog transmitters to the Sears Tower antenna farm ahead of the building's 1973 completion.) The station shut down its analog signal, over VHF channel 9, on June 12, 2009, the official date in which full-power television stations in the United States transitioned from analog to digital broadcasts under federal mandate. The WGN-TV digital signal continued to broadcast on its pre-transition UHF channel 19, with digital television receivers continuing to display WGN-TV's PSIP virtual channel as its former VHF analog channel 9. As a consequence, WGN-TV permanently ceased transmissions from the John Hancock Center's west antenna tower, establishing its existing digital facilities at the Sears Tower digital antenna as its main transmitter.

Though not a participant in the SAFER Act, WWME-CA carried simulcasts of WGN-TV's 9:00 p.m. newscast—except in the event of sports delays—and WMAQ-TV's morning and early evening newscasts until July 12 to provide an analog "lifeline" for viewers that were unprepared for or who had reception issues following the digital transition.

Canadian distribution
In April 1985, the Canadian Radio-television and Telecommunications Commission (CRTC) approved eligibility for the signals of WGN-TV and fellow American superstations WTBS, WOR-TV and WPIX to be retransmitted as foreign services by multichannel television providers within Canada. Under CRTC linkage rules first implemented in 1983 that require providers to offer U.S.-based program services in discretionary tiers tied to Canadian services, WGN-TV/WGN America and other authorized U.S. superstations typically have been sold to prospective subscribers of one or more domestic premium services—such as Crave (formerly First Choice and The Movie Network), Starz (formerly Moviepix and The Movie Network Encore), Super Channel, Super Écran and Western Canada-based regional pay services Movie Central (the original user of the Superchannel name, now defunct) and Encore Avenue (also now defunct). However, some providers have chosen to offer WGN in a specialty tier under a related rule that allows for an eligible superstation of the provider's choice to be carried on a non-premium tier. (Although KWGN-TV has also been authorized for carriage by the CRTC since that point, the Denver sister station is not carried on any multichannel television providers within Canada.)

After United Video began offering a separate national feed of WGN upon the stateside implementation the Syndex rules in January 1990, most Canadian cable providers began to replace the Chicago signal with the superstation feed as well. (Among the country's satellite providers, Star Choice [now Shaw Direct] began carrying the national feed upon the satellite provider's 1994 launch; Bell ExpressVu [now Bell Satellite TV] began distributing the Chicago-area signal when it commenced operations in 1996.) As a network affiliate, WGN-TV provided WB and CW programs to areas of Canada distant from the Canadian–U.S. border that could not receive over-the-air signals of other WB/CW affiliates from American cities. The WGN local feed was subjected to fewer sports blackouts than WGN America had been subjected to prior to the separation of the national and local feeds, as blackouts of programming to which Canadian broadcasters hold domestic rights apply only to imported U.S.-based specialty channels. However, simultaneous substitution rules have applied to certain CW programs that were also carried by Canadian-based terrestrial networks (such as Global, Citytv and CTV Two). The WGN-TV feed had also previously been available as part of the NHL Centre Ice sports package, primarily for simulcasts of Chicago Blackhawks games that WGN-TV aired until the 2018–19 season.

On January 17, 2007, WGN's main Canadian uplink carrier, Shaw Broadcast Services, switched its distributed feed of the station to the Chicago signal, a decision believed to have resulted from increased licensing fees for the then-superstation feed; despite this, some providers (including MTS TV and Cogeco Cable) continued to carry the superstation feed in place of or in conjunction with the Chicago signal. Despite this, some providers continued to carry the national WGN channel in lieu of or—as was the case with providers such as MTS TV and Cogeco Cable—in tandem with the Chicago feed, resulting in the duplication of CW network and many syndicated programs that are available within the country on other networks (such as fellow superstations KTLA and Boston-based WSBK-TV). While the CRTC had approved the Chicago station's broadcast signal and its national cable feed for carriage on any domestic multichannel television provider (including cable, satellite, IPTV and MMDS services), because of the conversion of WGN America from a superstation into an independent general-entertainment service and its resulting programming separation from WGN-TV, on December 15, 2014, Tribune Broadcasting sent notice that it would terminate all Canadian distribution rights for WGN America, effective January 1, 2015; the move was likely done to comply with CRTC genre protection rules in effect at the time, which prohibited the utilization of general entertainment programming formats by domestic or foreign cable channels. The WGN-TV Chicago feed, however, remains authorized for domestic distribution as a superstation. It is carried on Bell Satellite TV channel 1232 across Canada.

Notes

References

External links

 (Fort Peck, MT)
 (Red Lake, MN)
 (Carlin, NV)

GN-TV
Independent television stations in the United States
Antenna TV affiliates
Grit (TV network) affiliates
Rewind TV affiliates
TBD (TV network) affiliates
Television channels and stations established in 1948
1948 establishments in Illinois
Superstations in the United States
National Hockey League over-the-air television broadcasters